Yürekli is a village in the Elazığ District of Elazığ Province in Turkey. The village is populated by Kurds of the Zeyve tribe and had a population of 153 in 2021.

References

Villages in Elazığ District
Kurdish settlements in Elazığ Province